JDS Wakashio (SS-522) was the second s. She was commissioned on 30 June 1962.

Construction and career
Hayashio was laid down at Mitsubishi Heavy Industries Kobe Shipyard on 6 June 1960 and launched on 31 July 1961. She was commissioned on 30 June 1962, into the 1st Submarine Corps of the Kure District Force.

On 31 March 1963, the 1st Submarine was reorganized under the Self-Defense Fleet.

From 2 June to 19 August 1964, she participated in Hawaii dispatch training with Hayashio.

On 1 February 1965, the 1st Submarine was reorganized into the 1st Submarine Group, which was newly formed under the Self-Defense Fleet.

She was decommissioned on 23 March 1979 and dismantled at Kyowa Metal in October 1979.

Citations

1961 ships
Hayashio-class submarines
Ships built by Mitsubishi Heavy Industries